The Sea Isle City School District is community public school district that formerly directly operated a school that served students in pre-Kindergarten through eighth grade from Sea Isle City, New Jersey, United States. It currently does not operate any schools.

As of the 2008-09 school year, the district's one school had an enrollment of 67 students and 12.9 classroom teachers (on an FTE basis), for a student–teacher ratio of 5.2.

The district is classified by the New Jersey Department of Education as being in District Factor Group "B", the second lowest of eight groupings. District Factor Groups organize districts statewide to allow comparison by common socioeconomic characteristics of the local districts. From lowest socioeconomic status to highest, the categories are A, B, CD, DE, FG, GH, I and J.

For all grades students are sent to attend Ocean City School District in Ocean City as part of a sending/receiving relationship. For ninth through twelfth grades, the destination school is Ocean City High School.

History
New Jersey School District Number 30  was organized after Henry Ludlam, the town marshall, received an order to conduct a census of children in the municipality on August 15, 1882. Aldine House and Dolphin House were the initial locations for classes. Enrollment was 67 for the 1884-1885 school year. The district had one principal and one teacher in 1890.

The six classroom Sea Isle City Public School opened in 1914. The city government in 1970 sought to build another school after it determined the 1914 building to be "structurally deficient". A school was built in 1971, and it was dedicated on February 5, 1972. The 1914 building was ultimately razed after being used for other purposes.

In 2002 the school had 185 students. However after that point the population declined. Merger discussions with the Ocean City School District in 2008 ended after the Ocean City district indicated that it did not want to accept Sea Isle City's tenured teachers, which it would be required to do under state law. Sea Isle City in 2008 spent $35,000 per student and hoped to see savings through the merger, even after adding in transportation costs.

By 2009 there were 67 students. The final middle school graduation ceremony was held on June 18, 2009, and after that year middle school was closed.

As of June 30, 2012, Sea Isle City School is no longer open as per the Board of Education of the State of New Jersey. The district now sends all students pre-Kindergarten through twelfth grade to attend Ocean City Public Schools and agrees to share administrative services with said district.

The school building withstood little damage from Hurricane Sandy, so after the hurricane the municipal government moved several departments into the school building.

School
The Sea Isle City School had an enrollment of 67 students in the 2008-09 school year.

Administration
Core members of the district's administration are:
Dr. Kathleen Taylor, Superintendent
Thomas P. Grossi, Business Administrator / Board Secretary

Discrimination lawsuit
An African-American family filed a lawsuit against Sea Isle City, its police department and school board in 2004 alleging that their children were the target of racial slurs from teachers and were purposely excluded from participating in the Christmas play due to their race. In addition, the lawsuit also alleged that the police department filed false criminal charges against the family and harassed them. However, part of the lawsuit against Sea Isle City and the police department was settled in 2010 for $550,000. The lawsuit against the school board and individual teachers was settled in 2011 for $350,000.

References

Further reading
 Order to show cause to close school district
 Frequently asked questions

External links

School Data for the Sea Isle City School, National Center for Education Statistics

Sea Isle City, New Jersey
New Jersey District Factor Group B
School districts in Cape May County, New Jersey
Public K–8 schools in New Jersey
Schools in Cape May County, New Jersey
School districts established in 1882